Waldemar George (10 January, 1893, Lodz – 27 October 1970) was a Polish-born art historian and critic active primarily in France. Born Jerzy Waldemar Jarociński, he originally had a passport issued by the Russian Empire, but gained naturalised French citizenship after serving in the French Army during the First World War.

References

1893 births
1970 deaths
French art critics
French art historians
Emigrants from the Russian Empire to France
French soldiers
People of World War I